American male artistic gymnasts have competed at every Olympic Games since 1904, except for 1908, 1912, and 1980. In total, there have been 223 American male gymnasts who have competed at the Olympics.

History 
Over 100 athletes competed at the 1904 Olympics, and American teams won the gold, silver, and bronze in the team all-around and a total of 30 medals across all of the events. The United States returned to men's gymnastics at the 1920 Olympics, but did not win any medals. At the 1924 Olympics, Frank Kriz won the gold medal on the vault. At the 1932 Olympics, the men's team won the silver medal behind Italy. The next medal by an American man was not won until 1976 when Peter Kormann won the bronze medal on the floor exercise. At the 1984 Summer Olympics, the United States team won the gold medal. Additionally, the 1984 Olympic team won seven individual medals. At the 1992 Olympics, Trent Dimas won the gold medal on the horizontal bar. Then at the 1996 Summer Olympics, Jair Lynch won the silver medal on the parallel bars. The men's team won the silver medal behind Japan at the 2004 Summer Olympics. Additionally, Paul Hamm won the gold medal in the all-around as well as the silver medal on the horizontal bar. At the 2008 Olympics, the men's team won the bronze medal, and Jonathan Horton won the silver medal on the horizontal bar. Danell Leyva won the bronze medal in the all-around at the 2012 Olympics. Leyva also won the silver medal on the parallel bars and the horizontal bar at the 2016 Summer Olympics. Additionally, Alex Naddour won the bronze medal on the pommel horse.

Gymnasts

Medalists

See also
 List of Olympic female artistic gymnasts for the United States

References

United States
Artistic gymnasts